The John Trigg Ester Library is a small nonprofit membership library, located in Ester in the U.S. state of Alaska. The library has approximately 8,000 volumes in its collections with an additional 8,000 in storage, and is constructing a new library building. The library design is for the farthest-north Passive house structure in North America. Phase 1, the thermal storage tank, is completed and the library is seeking funding to proceed on to Phase 2, the building shell.

Library membership is dues-based, with most members coming from the Ester area; dues are $10 per year minimum, or for additional donation. The library is staffed by its nine-member volunteer board of directors and a small group of additional volunteers.

The library is housed in two facilities: a rented room in a building in the center of the village, and a historic log building across the street known as the Ansgar & Ida Clausen Cabin, which is currently being renovated. The library has a cold-storage annex and storage outbuildings for donated books, furniture, and equipment. An associated gazebo and public composting outhouse, situated about a block away near the village post office, serves as an outdoor reading room and event area in connection with the library.

The Ester library is a member of the Alaska Library Association and uses LibraryThing for its online catalog.

Programs
The library has two programs at present: a monthly winter lecture series featuring local speakers, and Growing Ester's Biodiversity (GEB), a seed sharing program dedicated to increasing local food security and agricultural sustainability. The GEB program's seed library is housed in the Clausen Cabin. A third program, focusing on old-time music played in the Interior from the early 1900s era, was proposed but became a separate organization.

Collections
The library has a small Alaska nonfiction/reference section, with special attention to books published in Ester or by or about Ester residents. This includes the only periodicals in the library, those published in Ester: Mushing Magazine from founding through 2005, Alaska Handywoman, and The Ester Republic. The annual reports of the Ester Volunteer Fire Department are also included, but the collection is not yet complete. One periodical published elsewhere, Orion, was donated to the library and so also is in the periodicals section. The library's Alaska nonfiction section also includes many Alaska Geographics.

The library also has several foreign language and Alaska Native language titles. These are not separated from the regular collections (primarily due to the lack of space) but are integrated into the main sections: Reference, Fiction, Nonfiction, Circumpolar nonfiction, Young readers, Literature, Metaphysics & philosophy, Video/CD fiction & animated, Video/CD nonfiction, Books on tape/CD. Languages include:  Athabaskan, Yup'ik, Russian, French, German, Danish, Hungarian, Spanish, and Portuguese. The library also has an extensive collection (for its size) of non-English dictionaries, grammars, and language self-study books.

Collection development plans include expansion of the movies section and inclusion of a music collection.

The Ester library has developed its collection almost exclusively from donated and found books, videos, DVDs, and audiobooks. As a result, the collection is eclectic, reflecting the reading habits of members of the community. The family of John Trigg has been a major donor both in books and funds. Much of the library's collection of science, science fiction, fantasy, and mystery titles were originally from Trigg's private library or donated by his family. Other major collections include books from the estate of Sue Ann Bowling, the Helfferich family, Robert Barr, Richard Heacox, and the estate of David Stannis, among others.

Book Shelf Project
In a fashion similar to the Noel Wien Public Library's Book Tile Project, the Ester library raises money by dedications with engraved plaques, to be affixed on bookshelves in the new building ($50 per plaque, one plaque per shelf).

History

The Ester library was founded in the summer of 1999. It was held by the Ester Community Association between 2004 and 2009. The library received separate nonprofit recognition from the State of Alaska in November 2009  and received federal charitable nonprofit status (IRS 501(c)(3) recognition) in 2011, retroactive to November 19, 2009.

Hours of operation

The John Trigg Ester Library is open seven days a week from 9 am to 9 pm.

References

External links
JTEL blog
JTEL website
LibraryThing online catalog for the Ester library (in progress).

Buildings and structures in Fairbanks North Star Borough, Alaska
Libraries in Alaska
Education in Fairbanks North Star Borough, Alaska
1999 establishments in Alaska